Goodbye Alice in Wonderland is the sixth studio album by singer-songwriter Jewel, released on May 2, 2006, through Atlantic Records. The album marks a return to her musical roots after 0304, and trying to write an autobiographical album like she did with Pieces of You. The album was written in the form of a novel with each track representing a chapter. Although the first official single was "Again and Again", the title track "Goodbye Alice in Wonderland" debuted a month earlier on her website as an Internet exclusive. The second single, "Good Day" was released to radio in late June 2006. The next single was "Stephenville, TX". A video for it can be seen on Yahoo! Launch.

The album made its debut at No. 8 on the Billboard 200, with sales of 82,000 copies its first week, and became Jewel's fifth top 10 album in the United States. However, after only 12 weeks the album slid out of the Billboard 200. The album reappeared one week later after heavy promotion on various talk shows. It had sold 377,000 copies in the U.S. as of June 2010.
Jewel stated she had plans to re-release the album, but her record company would not let her. However, they did allow her to release two singles in 2007.

Background 
After refashioning herself as a dance-pop diva on 2003's 0304, which debuted at number two on the Billboard 200 chart, Jewel returned to safe territory with "Goodbye Alice in Wonderland". Like 0304, the album comes with an explanation/apology from its auteur: "Goodbye Alice in Wonderland is the story of my life and is the most autobiographical album I have made since Pieces of You... By the end of the 13th song, if you have listened closely, you will have heard the story of the sirens song that seduced me, of a path I both followed and led, of bizarre twists and turns that opened my eyes, forcing me to find solutions so that discovering the truth would not lead to a loss of hope."

According to Allmusic's senior editor Stephen Thomas Erlewine, assisted by producer Rob Cavallo—who has produced records for Michelle Branch and the Goo Goo Dolls—Jewel has created her most sonically appealing record, one that has plenty of different shades and textures.

The record finds the singer-songwriter exploring a number of musical styles—from the country tinge of "Stephenville, TX" and upbeat pop of "Satellite," to the folksy opening one-two punch, "Again and Again" and "Long Slow Slide." "I'm a Gemini," Jewel says to explain her range. "I have a lot of moods."

To give her moods a flow, she programmed Alice's thirteen songs—all recorded live—as if the album were a concert. "I start in a certain place," she says, "bring it up into sort of a rock set, and then I come back down."

Atlantic Records opted not to renew her contract at the end of 2006, and Goodbye Alice in Wonderland would be her final album of new material with them.

Songs 

The first song and lead single "Again and Again" is a "slick, radio-ready ditty as vacuous as it is catchy", according to Slant's Preston Jones. "Long Slow Slide" shows a sensitive folkie side. "Growing up is not an absence of dreaming," she states on the title track "Goodbye Alice in Wonderland". Slant's Preston Jones wrote that it "feels naggingly familiar, as though Jewel mined her back catalog to rework a lesser-known song." The fourth track and second single "Good Day" opens with her standing in front of her fridge at midnight, drawling: "I might make a wish – if I believed in that shit." On the fifth track "Satellite", written when she was 18, she notes that "the Pope," "rock and roll," "Valium," even "Miss Cleo" can't fix her broken heart.

The sixth track "Only One Too" was released as the third single of the album and a remixes EP was released on October 10, 2006, featuring 5 remixes. "Fragile Heart" is originally featured on 0304. While the musical arrangement was more "club" oriented in the original release, the new version is more calm and soft. "So why not follow me, the blond bombshell deity?/I'll sell you neat ideas without big words/And a little bit of cleavage to help wash it all down," she sings on the country "Stephenville, TX". Her crystalline vocal harmonies are grossly reduced on the album, save for the track "1000 Miles Away".

Critical reception 

At Metacritic, which assigns a normalized rating out of 100 given to reviews from mainstream critics, the album received an average score of 57, based on 18 reviews, which indicates "mixed or average reviews". Allmusic's editor Stephen Thomas Erlewine gave to the album 4.5 out of 5 stars, writing that the album "may have an entirely different feel and intent than its glitzy predecessor, but like 0304 (2003), it is proof that even if Jewel doesn't have as high a profile, or perhaps as large an audience, as she did in 1996, she's a better songwriter and record-maker than she was at the outset of her career." Gordon Agar from Observer Music Monthly wrote that the producer Rob Cavallo added "a colourful Lilith to Jewel's often shrill soprano" and called the album "lovely." While Caroline Sullivan from The Guardian called the album "A surprisingly substantial return." Leah Greenblatt from Entertainment Weekly wrote that "Somewhere beneath the Lilith earnestness glints something sharper."

Comparing the album with her latest "0304", Kathleen C. Fennessy from Amazon wrote that "What's changed is that maturity has granted Jewel, now in her early 30s, greater perspective and a sense of humor missing from her more earnest early work." Ayo Jegede from Stylus Magazine wrote that on the album "we find Jewel going through the motions rather than providing us with a noteworthy movement and in the end these songs here are less artistic pronouncements and more the conclusion of a specific product line."

Catie James from Blogcritics wrote a mixed review, writing that "the problem with Alice is a case of the music overwhelming the lyrics in most of the album’s songs." Edd Hurt from Paste Magazine gave to the album 2.5 out of 5 stars, stating that "Jewel never appears to be going through the motions—her grasp of pop form is as compelling as her voice, which shades from callow to knowing to heroic with her unique, troubled aplomb." Preston Jones from Slant Magazine gave to the album only 2 stars out of 5, writing that "while Goodbye Alice In Wonderland is a return to form for Jewel, said form is bland, mostly colorless, and devoid of any truly memorable cuts that elevate the album to a disc worth spinning more than once." Christian Hoard from Rolling Stone gave the album the same score of 2 out of 5 stars, saying that it "might keep Jewel on the charts, but its bright come-ons sound both overdone and undercooked."

Commercial performance 
Goodbye Alice in Wonderland debuted at number eight on the Billboard 200 with first-week sales of 82,000 copies, continuing a string of top ten releases, only broken by her ninth studio album Sweet and Wild (2010). It has sold 377,000 copies in the U.S. as of June 2010.

Track listing
"Again and Again" (J. Kilcher/J. Shanks) – 3:57
"Long Slow Slide" (J. Kilcher) – 3:48
"Goodbye Alice in Wonderland" (J. Kilcher) – 5:55
"Good Day" (J. Kilcher/G. Wells/K. DioGuardi) – 3:46
"Satellite" (J.Kilcher) – 5:05
"Only One Too" (J. Kilcher/J. Shanks) – 3:04
"Words Get in the Way" (J. Kilcher) – 3:58
"Drive to You" (J. Kilcher/L. Mendez) – 4:14
"Last Dance Rodeo" (J. Kilcher) – 6:16
"Fragile Heart" (J. Kilcher/A. Bell) – 3:21 (new version; previously on 0304)
"Stephenville, TX" (J. Kilcher) – 3:56
"Where You Are" (J. Kilcher) – 3:28
"1000 Miles Away" (J. Kilcher) – 3:48

iTunes Bonus Tracks
<li>"1000 Miles Away" (Acoustic Live) – 3:45
<li>"Interview" – 3:29

Bonus tracks
<li>"Satellite" (live acoustic version) – available with iTunes pre-order
<li>"1000 Miles Away" (live acoustic version) – available on UK iTunes when full album is purchased

International bonus tracks
<li>"A Long Slow Slide" (acoustic version)
<li>"Foolish Games" (live)

Two-disc set
A two-disc set of the album was released by Target Corporation which included a DVD.

DVD track listing:

 The Making of the "Again and Again" Video
 The Making of the Album
 "Goodbye Alice in Wonderland" video

Personnel
 Paul Bushnell – bass guitar
 David Campbell – horn arrangements, string arrangements
 Rob Cavallo – electric guitar
 Luis Conte – percussion
 Dorian Crozier – drums, programming
 Jewel – acoustic guitar, lead vocals, background vocals
 Jamie Muhoberac – keyboards, piano
 John Pierce – bass guitar
 Tim Pierce – electric guitar
 Greg Suran – electric guitar

Charts

Album

Singles

Certifications

|}

References

2006 albums
Jewel (singer) albums
Albums arranged by David Campbell (composer)
Albums produced by Rob Cavallo
Atlantic Records albums
2006 video albums
Warner Records albums
Warner Records video albums
Atlantic Records video albums